Liz James is a British art historian who studies the art of the Byzantine Empire. She is Professor of the History of Art at the University of Sussex.

Career 
James is originally from Derby, East Midlands. She received an undergraduate degree at the University of Durham in Ancient History and Archaeology. She completed a master's degree in Byzantine studies at the University of Birmingham. She received her doctorate at the Courtauld Institute in London in 1989, studying under Robin Cormack. Her thesis discussed light and colour in Byzantine art and was entitled Colour Perception in Byzantium. Upon completion, she embarked on postdoctoral fellowships, notably at the Barber Institute. In 1993 she joined the University of Sussex.

James was appointed Professor in 2007. Her professorial lecture was given in 2011 and discussed the mosaics in the apse of Hagia Sophia.

Research specialism 
James is known as a keen promoter of all areas of Byzantine art and Byzantine culture. She has particular interests in mosaics and in gender issues. She has written extensively on mosaics, discussing practical, iconographic and materialistic approaches to the subject. She has also established a database of Byzantine glass mosaics. In the field of gender, she has discussed Byzantine empresses, eunuchs and the way Byzantine society reacted to gender. She is also interested in the relationship between text and image, believing Byzantine texts to be of equal importance to Byzantine art. James contributed to the Royal Academy's 2008 Byzantium exhibition catalogue and gave a lecture to the academy.

Publications

Books 
Empresses and Power in Early Byzantium (Leicester University Press, 2001)
Light and Colour in Byzantine Art (Clarendon Press, Oxford, 1996)

Edited books 
Art and Text in Byzantium (Cambridge University Press, 2007), Introduction, and paper, '"And shall these mute stones speak?" Text as image'.
Icon and Word. The power of images in Byzantium (Ashgate, 2003), editor with Antony Eastmond, and contributor, "Introduction: Icon and Word", xxix–xxxiv, and "Art and Lies: Text, image and imagination in the medieval world", 59–72.
Desire and Denial in Byzantium (Variorum, Aldershot, 1999)
Women, men and eunuchs: gender in Byzantium (Routledge, London, 1997), editor and contributor, "Introduction: Women's Studies, Gender Studies, Byzantine Studies", xi–xxiv

Other publications 
 'At Church' in eds. R. Cormack and M. Vassilaki, Byzantium 330–1453 (Royal Academy, London, 2008)

'Seeing is believing but words tell no lies: captions and images in the Libri Carolini and Byzantine Iconoclasm' in eds. A. L. McClanan and J. Johnson, Negating the image: case studies in iconoclasm (Ashgate, 2005), 97–112
'Get your kit on! Issues in the depiction of clothing in Byzantium' (with Shaun Tougher) in ed. L. Cleland, M. Harlow and L. Llewellyn-Jones, The Clothed Body in the Ancient World (Oxbow, 2005), 154–161
'Good luck and good fortune to the Queen of Cities: empresses and tyches in Byzantium' in eds. E. J. Stafford and J. Herrin, Personification in the Greek world (Ashgate, 2005), 293–308
'Adorned with piety: authority, devotion and the empress in early Byzantium', in ed. M.Vassilaki, Images of the Mother of God, (Ashgate, 2005), 145–52

'Who's that girl? Personifications of the Byzantine empress' in ed. C. Entwistle, Through a Glass Brightly. Festschrift for David Buckton (Oxbow Publications, Oxford 2004), 51–6

'Dry bones and painted pictures: relics and icons in Byzantium' in ed. A. Lidov, Eastern Christian Relics (Research Centre for Eastern Christian Culture, Moscow, 2002), 45–55
'Bearing gifts from the East: imperial relic-hunters abroad' in ed. A. Eastmond, Eastern Approaches to Byzantium (Ashgate, Aldershot, 2000), 119–132
'What colours were Byzantine mosaics?' in eds. E. Borsook, F. Superbi, G. Pagliarulo, Medieval mosaics: light, color, materials (Harvard University Centre for Italian Renaissance Studies, Florence, 2000), 35–46
'As the actress said to the bishop...Byzantine women in English-language fiction', in eds. R. S. Cormack and E. Jeffreys, Through the Looking-Glass. Byzantium through British eyes (Ashgate, Aldershot 2000), 237–249
'Women and politics in the Byzantine Empire: imperial women' in ed. L. E. Mitchell, Women in Medieval Western European Culture (Garland, 1999), (with Barbara Hill), 157–178
'Goddess, whore, wife or slave? Will the real Byzantine empress please stand up' in ed. A. Duggan, Queens and Queenship in Medieval Europe (Boydell and Brewer,1997), 123–40
'"Pray not to fall into temptation and be on your guard". Antique Statues in Byzantine Constantinople', Gesta 35 (1996), 12–20

'The East Dome of San Marco: a reconsideration', Dumbarton Oaks Papers 48 (1994), (with E. J. W. Hawkins), 229–242
'Monks, monastic art and the Middle Byzantine Church' in eds. M. Mullett & A. Kirby, The Theotokos Evergetis and Eleventh Century Monasticism (Belfast Byzantine Texts and Translations, Belfast 1994), 162–175.
'Zoe. The rhythm method of imperial renewal' in ed. P.Magdalino, New Constantines (Variorum, Aldershot, 1994) (with B. Hill & D. C. Smythe), 215–230

References 

Year of birth missing (living people)
Living people
People from Derby
English art historians
Women art historians
British Byzantinists
British women historians
British classical scholars
Women classical scholars
Academics of the University of Sussex
Alumni of the University of Birmingham
Alumni of the Courtauld Institute of Art
Alumni of Van Mildert College, Durham
Historians of Byzantine art
Women Byzantinists
Women medievalists